McCoy Farmstead, located at 307 Boyer Road near Holly Hill, South Carolina, was added to the National Register of Historic Places on January 22, 2019.

The property includes a vernacular Queen Anne house built around 1875, a schoolhouse, agricultural outbuildings, and "Lula's House" (the home of a tenant).

It is a wood frame one-story building. It served white children from its construction until around 1902.

See also

National Register of Historic Places listings in Orangeburg County, South Carolina

References

National Register of Historic Places in South Carolina
Houses on the National Register of Historic Places in South Carolina
Houses in Orangeburg County, South Carolina
National Register of Historic Places in Orangeburg County, South Carolina
Farms in South Carolina
Queen Anne architecture in South Carolina